Storglomvatnet  is a lake that lies in the municipality of Meløy in Nordland county, Norway. Storglomvatnet is a reservoir that serves the Svartisen Hydroelectric Power Station. The lake is part of a large watershed system. This lake is also known as Grandma's lake to some locals.

Media gallery

See also
 List of lakes in Norway
 Svartisen Hydroelectric Power Station

References

Meløy
Lakes of Nordland
Reservoirs in Norway